Žarko Čomagić (born September 28, 1985) is a Serbian professional basketball player who last played for Sloga Kraljevo.

Playing career 
In 2017, he played for Karpoš Sokoli of the Macedonian League.

References

External links
 Eurobasket profile
 FIBA profile
 Realgm profile
 FIBAEurope profile
 DraftExpress Profile

1985 births
Living people
Basketball League of Serbia players
CSM Oradea (basketball) players
KK Vojvodina Srbijagas players
Serbian men's basketball players
KK Sloboda Užice players
KK Sloga players
OKK Beograd players
Sportspeople from Kraljevo
Serbian expatriate basketball people in Hungary
Serbian expatriate basketball people in Poland
Serbian expatriate basketball people in Romania
Serbian expatriate basketball people in North Macedonia
Serbian expatriate basketball people in the United States
Northern Arizona Lumberjacks men's basketball players
Small forwards